Lucien Masset (11 May 1914 – 17 April 2005) was a French gymnast. He competed at the 1936 Summer Olympics and the 1948 Summer Olympics.

References

1914 births
2005 deaths
French male artistic gymnasts
Olympic gymnasts of France
Gymnasts at the 1936 Summer Olympics
Gymnasts at the 1948 Summer Olympics
Sportspeople from Lyon